Pigcasso is a 700-kilogram painting pig from South Africa who has sold millions of rands worth of artworks all over the world. Pigcasso is best known for being the first non-human artist to host her own art exhibition and for collaborating with the watch maker Swatch to design its 2019 limited edition Flying Pig watch. More broadly, she is known for inspiring conversations around veganism, vegetarianism, and animal rights.

Early life 
Pigcasso was born in April 2016 on an industrialised pig farm in the Winelands region of the Western Cape, South Africa. She was rescued in May 2016 by Joanne Lefson and taken to Farm Sanctuary SA in Franschhoek, the nonprofit organization that Lefson also founded that year. When Lefson noticed that the pig ate and destroyed everything in her stall besides some paint brushes, she decided to nurture the pig’s interest in painting. Employing positive reinforcement techniques, Lefson quickly taught the pig to start using the brushes to apply paint to paper mounted on an easel placed before her. By dipping the brush in different colors, the pig began to create colorful abstract paintings, which Lefson then sold to raise funds for the farm sanctuary.

Each of Pigcasso’s works is signed by means of the artist dipping her nose-tip into beetroot ink and touching it onto the canvas.

Art career
Pigcasso and Lefson are the first non-human/human collaboration to have held an art exhibition together, which took place at the Victoria & Alfred Waterfront in Cape Town in 2018. Pigcasso’s artworks are considered to be abstract expressionist as opposed to figurative, and have sold for millions of rands to collectors around the world. Three of her most famous pieces are ‘Peacock’, ‘Snowman’, and ‘Mouse’, each of which sold for $5000 in 2021. A painting of Prince Harry that was sold to a Spanish buyer for £2,350 in 2021 also received global notoriety, based on its royal subject matter. 

On 13 December 2021, Pigcasso sold an artwork for £20,000,  a record price for an artwork created by an animal.  The 1.6 x 2.6 metre canvas, titled Wild and Free, was purchased by German art collector Peter Esser, eclipsing the £14,000 previously paid for an animal artwork (a painting by Congo the chimpanzee bought by the American collector Howard Hong). 

The partnership between Pigcasso and Lefson has been noted for igniting debate around the definition of art and animal creativity, while also drawing attention to the living conditions of farmed animals around the world. Lefson has stated that her aim is to educate the public about the devastating effects of animal agriculture on the welfare of animals and the environment in order to inspire a kinder, more sustainable world.

Collaborations 
Pigcasso became the first non-human artist to endorse a commercial product when she was commissioned by watch maker Swatch to design their 2019 watch called ‘Flying Pig’. She was also featured in the 60th anniversary advertisement of the Nissan Skyline (2017), and in 2020, she launched her own Pigcasso wine range from the grapes that grow at the farm sanctuary where she lives.

Media appearances 

Over the course of her life, Pigcasso has been featured on various global media channels. For instance, her artistic exploits have been covered on Saturday Night Live,  ABC, NBC, CBS, CNN, National Geographic, Sky news, and the BBC.

She has also appeared live on the Jeremy Vine Show (2020) and in leading publications such as include The Times newspaper and Spiegel.

See also
Oscar (2004), dog adopted from a shelter by Joanne Lefson

References

External links 
Pigcasso Official website
Farm Sanctuary SA Official website
Joanne Lefson Official website

Individual pigs
Animal painters
Veganism
Animal rights